Pepel is a coastal town in the Port Loko District in the Northern Province of Sierra Leone.

Port 

Pepel has a port in the Sierra Leone River used for shipping bulk iron ore via the mining company African Minerals.

Railway 

Pepel is connected by a  gauge 84 km long railway to an iron ore mine at Marampa.

It is proposed to introduce a more efficient balloon loop at the port.

An extension of this line to a deeper port at Tagrin Point is also proposed.

See also 

 Railway stations in Sierra Leone
 Transport in Sierra Leone

References 

Populated places in Sierra Leone
Western Area